The 2012 Pan-American Volleyball Cup was the eleventh edition of the annual women's volleyball tournament, played by twelve countries in July 2012 in Ciudad Juárez, Chihuahua, Mexico, after Lima, Peru, withdrew from hosting it. The top four NORCECA teams and the top from CSV confederation, in addition to Brazil, which was a wild card, qualified for the 2013 FIVB World Grand Prix.

Competing nations

Pool standing procedure
Match won 3–0: 5 points for the winner, 0 point for the loser
Match won 3–1: 4 points for the winner, 1 points for the loser
Match won 3–2: 3 points for the winner, 2 points for the loser
In case of tie, the teams were classified according to the following criteria:
points ratio and sets ratio

Preliminary round

Group A

Group B

Final round

Championship bracket

5th–10th places bracket

Eleventh place match

Classification 7–10

Quarterfinals

Classification 5–8

Ninth place match

Semifinals

Seventh place match

Fifth place match

Bronze medal match

Gold medal match

Final standing

Individual awards

Most Valuable Player
  Kristin Richards
Best Scorer
  Kristin Richards
Best Spiker
  Yanelis Santos
Best Blocker
  Natasha Farinea
Best Server
  Yanelis Santos
Best Digger
  Brenda Castillo
Best Setter
  Elena Keldibekova
Best Receiver
  Brenda Castillo
Best Libero
  Brenda Castillo

References

Women's Pan-American Volleyball Cup
Pan-American Volleyball Cup
Women's Pan-American Volleyball Cup
2012 Women's Pan-American Volleyball Cup